Leptobasis melinogaster, the cream-tipped swampdamsel, is a species of damselfly in the family Coenagrionidae. It is found in Mexico and the United States. Its natural habitats are intermittent rivers and freshwater marshes.

References 

Coenagrionidae
Insects described in 2002
Taxonomy articles created by Polbot